Boscobel High School is located in Boscobel, Wisconsin.

Description
The building is three stories tall and clad in local limestone with a four-story tall tower. It is now called the Rock School.

References

School buildings on the National Register of Historic Places in Wisconsin
National Register of Historic Places in Grant County, Wisconsin
Public high schools in Wisconsin
Schools in Grant County, Wisconsin
Richardsonian Romanesque architecture in Wisconsin
Limestone buildings in the United States
School buildings completed in 1898